Ann Burns  may refer to:

Olive Ann Burns, writer
Anne Burns, engineer and pilot
Anne Burns (linguist), linguist

See also
Anne Byrne (disambiguation)